The 2019 season was the Atlanta Falcons' 54th in the National Football League (NFL), their third playing their home games at Mercedes-Benz Stadium and their fifth under and final full season under head coach Dan Quinn, as he would be fired during their next season. They tried to improve on their 7–9 season from 2018, and return to the playoffs for the first time since 2017. However, the Falcons stumbled out of the gate and had their worst start for the first time in 16 years with a 1–7 record to begin the campaign.

After a loss at home to the rival New Orleans Saints, the Falcons suffered their second consecutive losing season and were mathematically eliminated from playoff contention for the second year in a row. However, the Falcons went 6–2 over the final half of the season, tied for the best record in the NFC during that span, to finish the season with a 7–9 record for the second straight year and 2nd in the NFC South.

NFL draft

Notes
As the result of a negative differential of free agent signings and departures that the Falcons experienced during the  free agency period, the team received two compensatory selections for the 2019 draft.

Trades

The Falcons traded their second-round (45th overall) and third-round (79th overall) picks to the Los Angeles Rams in exchange for their first-round (31st overall) and sixth-round (203rd overall) selections.
The Falcons traded their fourth-round (117th overall) and sixth-round (186th overall) selection to the Detroit Lions in exchange for their fourth-round (111th overall) selection.
The Falcons traded their fourth-round (137th overall) and seventh-round (230th overall) selection to the Oakland Raiders in exchange for their fourth-round (135th overall) selection.

Staff

Final roster

Preseason
The Falcons played the Denver Broncos in the Pro Football Hall of Fame Game on Thursday, August 1, at Tom Benson Hall of Fame Stadium in Canton, Ohio. The Falcons were represented by tight end Tony Gonzalez, who spent the final five seasons of his career with the Falcons from 2009–2013.

Regular season

Schedule

Note: Intra-division opponents are in bold text.

Game summaries

Week 1: at Minnesota Vikings

Week 2: vs. Philadelphia Eagles

Week 3: at Indianapolis Colts

Week 4: vs. Tennessee Titans

Week 5: at Houston Texans

Week 6: at Arizona Cardinals

Week 7: vs. Los Angeles Rams

Week 8: vs. Seattle Seahawks

Week 10: at New Orleans Saints

Week 11: at Carolina Panthers

Week 12: vs. Tampa Bay Buccaneers

Week 13: vs. New Orleans Saints
Thanksgiving Day Games

Week 14: vs. Carolina Panthers

Week 15: at San Francisco 49ers

Week 16: vs. Jacksonville Jaguars

Week 17: at Tampa Bay Buccaneers

Standings

Division

Conference

References

External links

Atlanta
Atlanta Falcons seasons
Atlanta Falcons